Linuparus, the spear lobsters, is a genus of medium-sized to large spiny lobsters in the family Palinuridae. L. trigonus is the only extant species also known from the fossil record.

Extant species

Linuparus meridionalis Tsoi, Chan & Chu, 2011
Linuparus somniosus Berry & George, 1972
Linuparus sordidus Bruce, 1965
Linuparus trigonus (von Siebold, 1824)

Extinct species

Linpuarus adkinsi Rathbun, 1935
Linpuarus africanus Glaessner, 1932
Linpuarus bererensis Secretan, 1964
Linpuarus bigranulatus Glaessner, 1930
Linpuarus canadensis (Whiteaves, 1885)
Linpuarus carteri (Reed, 1911)
Linpuarus dentatus Van Straelen, 1936
Linpuarus duelmenensis (Geinitz, 1849–50)
Linpuarus dzheirantuiensis Feldmann et al., 2007
Linpuarus eocenicus Woods, 1925
Linpuarus euthymei (Roman & Mazeran 1920)
Linpuarus grimmeri Stenzel, 1945
Linpuarus hantscheli Mertin, 1941
Linpuarus japonicus Nagao, 1931
Linpuarus kleinfelderi Rathbun, 1931
Linpuarus korura Feldmann & Bearlin, 1988
Linpuarus laevicephalus Mertin, 1941
Linpuarus macellarii Feldmann & Tshudy, 1988
Linpuarus petkovici Benchmayer & Markovic, 1955
Linpuarus pustulosus Feldmann et al., 1977
Linpuarus richardsi Roberts, 1962
Linpuarus schluteri (Tribolet, 1874)
Linpuarus scyllariformis (Bell, 1858)
Linpuarus spinosus Collins & Rasmussen, 1992
Linpuarus stolleyi (Haas, 1889)
Linpuarus straili (Forir, 1887)
Linpuarus tarrantensis Davidson, 1963
Linpuarus texanus Rathbun, 1935
Linpuarus vancouverensis (Whiteaves, 1895)
Linpuarus watkinsi Stenzel, 1945
Linpuarus wilcoxensis Rathbun, 1935

References

Achelata
Extant Aptian first appearances
Decapod genera
Taxa named by Adam White (zoologist)